An Ironman Triathlon is one of a series of long-distance triathlon races organized by the World Triathlon Corporation (WTC), consisting of a  swim, a  bicycle ride and a marathon  run completed in that order, a total of . It is widely considered one of the most difficult one-day sporting events in the world.

Most Ironman events have a time limit of 16 or 17 hours to complete the race, course dependent, with the race typically starting at 7:00am. The mandatory cut off time to complete the  swim is 2 hours 20 minutes. The mandatory bike cut off time for when an athlete must have completed their swim, transition and bike varies generally between 10 hours and 10 hours 30 minutes from when an athlete began their swim. The mandatory run cut off varies between 16 and 17 hours from when athlete began their swim. Many races will also have intermediate bike, run, and transition cut off times specific to each race venue. Any participant who completes the triathlon within these time constraints is designated an Ironman.

The name "Ironman Triathlon" is also associated with the original Ironman triathlon what is now the Ironman World Championship. Held in Kailua-Kona, the world championship has been held annually in Hawaii since 1978 (with an additional race in 1982). Originally taking place in Oahu, the race moved to Kailua-Kona in 1981 and it continues today. The Ironman World Championship has become known for its grueling length, harsh race conditions, and television coverage.

There are other races that are the same distance as an Ironman triathlon but are not produced, owned, or licensed by the WTC. They include The Challenge Family series' Challenge Roth and the Norseman Triathlon.

The event series is owned by The Ironman Group, which is owned by Advance Publications, following the acquisition from the Wanda Sports Group in August 2020.

History

The idea for the original Ironman Triathlon arose during the awards ceremony for the 1977 Oʻahu Perimeter Relay. Among the participants were representatives of both the Mid-Pacific Road Runners and the Waikiki Swim Club, whose members had long been debating which athletes were more fit, runners or swimmers. On this occasion, U.S. Navy Commander John Collins pointed out that a recent article in Sports Illustrated magazine had declared that Belgian cyclist Eddy Merckx had the highest recorded "oxygen uptake" of any athlete ever measured, so perhaps cyclists were more fit than anyone. Collins and his wife Judy Collins had taken part in the triathlons staged in 1974 and 1975 by the San Diego Track Club in and around Mission Bay, California, as well as the 1975 Optimist Sports Fiesta Triathlon in Coronado, California. A number of the other military athletes in attendance were also familiar with the San Diego races, so they understood the concept when Collins suggested that the debate should be settled through a race combining the three existing long-distance competitions already on the island: the Waikiki Roughwater Swim, the Around-Oahu Bike Race (originally a two-day event) and the Honolulu Marathon.

Until that time, no one present had ever done the bike race. Prior to racing, each athlete received three sheets of paper listing a few rules and a course description. Handwritten on the last page was this exhortation: "Swim 2.4 miles! Bike 112 miles! Run 26.2 miles! Brag for the rest of your life", now a registered trademark.

With a nod to a local runner who was notorious for his demanding workouts, Collins said, "Whoever finishes first, we'll call him the Iron Man." Each of the racers had their own support crew to supply water, food and encouragement during the event. Of the fifteen men to start off in the early morning on February 18, 1978, twelve completed the race. Gordon Haller, a US Navy Communications Specialist, was the first to earn the title Ironman by completing the course with a time of 11 hours, 46 minutes, 58 seconds. The runner-up John Dunbar, a US Navy SEAL, led after the second transition and had a chance to win but ran out of water on the marathon course; his support crew resorted to giving him beer instead.

With no further marketing efforts, the race gathered as many as 50 athletes in 1979. The race, however, was postponed a day because of bad weather conditions. Only fifteen competitors started off the race Sunday morning. San Diego's Tom Warren won in 11 hours, 15 minutes, 56 seconds. Lyn Lemaire, a championship cyclist from Boston, placed sixth overall and became the first "Ironwoman". Collins planned on changing the race into a relay event to draw more participants, but Sports Illustrated's journalist Barry McDermott, in the area to cover a golf tournament, discovered the race and wrote a ten-page account of it. During the following year, hundreds of curious participants contacted Collins.

Valerie Silk and WTC
Around 1979 Collins no longer wanted to direct the Ironman race and approached Nautilus Fitness Center owners Hank Grundman and Valerie Silk about taking over control of the race. Grundman previously had extended his club's facilities to many of the Ironman competitors. Following the couple's divorce in 1981 Silk received ownership of Ironman. That year she moved the competition to the less urbanized Hawaii Island (called the Big Island) and in 1982 moved the race date from February to October; as a result of this change there were two Ironman Triathlon events in 1982.

A milestone in the marketing of the legend and history of the race happened in February 1982. Julie Moss, a college student competing to gather research for her exercise physiology thesis, moved toward the finish line in first place. As she neared the finish, severe fatigue and dehydration set in and she fell, just yards away from the finish line. Although Kathleen McCartney passed her for the women's title, Moss nevertheless crawled to the finish line. Her performance was broadcast worldwide and created the Ironman mantra that just finishing is a victory. By the end of that year the race had maxed out at 1,000 participants, with a lottery used to fill the field while turning away another 1,000 interested participants.

In 1990, with the help of Lew Friedland, Dr. James P. Gills acquired and purchased the Hawaii Triathlon Corporation, owner of the Ironman brand for $3 million from Silk. With the Ironman brand, Gills established the World Triathlon Corporation with the intention of furthering the sport of triathlon and increasing prize money for triathletes.

A number of non-WTC full distance triathlons have been held since the mid-1990s. The limited number of WTC-sanctioned events, and the limited number of entries available per race, have combined with a growth in the sport that has created demand for these non-trademarked events. Originally, many used the Ironman name. Due to aggressive trademark protection, most of these races no longer use the word "Ironman".

Today
The Ironman format remains unchanged, and the Hawaiian Ironman is still regarded as an honored and prestigious triathlon event to win worldwide.

People completing such an event within the strict event time cutoffs are agreed to be recognized as "Ironmen"; the plural "Ironmans" refers to multiples of "Ironman" as a short form of "Ironman Triathlon." In the triathlon community an Ironman is someone who has completed a race of the appropriate distance, whether or not it falls under the aegis of WTC.

Swim Smart Initiative
In 2013, Ironman piloted the "Swim Smart Initiative" in North America and brought with it some notable safety related changes to the Ironman format. These changes included new rules regarding swim course formats, water temperature regulations, pre-swim warm ups, wave starts, and additional rescue boats/watercraft (paddle-boards, kayaks, etc.). The Swim Smart Initiative also introduced "resting rafts" so that athletes may leave the water to rest without being disqualified.

Ironman World Championship

Over time the popularity of the sport of triathlon grew, and the annual race on the Big Island became The Ironman World Championship. In 1983, admission to the race began following a qualification based system, whereby athletes had to obtain entry to the race by competing in another Ironman race and gaining a slot, allocated on a proportional basis. The Hawaii race consists of a swim in the bay of Kailua-Kona, a bike ride across the Hawaiian lava desert to Hāwī and back, and a marathon run along the coast (from Keauhou to Keahole Point and back to Kailua-Kona); finishing on Alii Drive. The most recent Ironman World Championship took place on October 6, 2022 and was won by Gustav Iden of Norway in 7:40:24 and Chelsea Sodaro of the United States in 8:33:46.

The current Ironman Hawaii course record was set in 2022 by Gustav Iden (Norway), whose winning time was 7 hours 40 minutes 24 seconds. Daniela Ryf (Switzerland) set the women's course record in 2018 with a winning time of 8 hours 26 minutes 18 seconds.

Amateur triathletes can qualify for the World Championship through placement in one of the other Ironman series of races. Entry into the race can also be obtained through various contests and promotions, or through the Ironman Foundation's charitable eBay auction.

Ironman series
There are over three dozen Ironman Triathlon races throughout the world that enable qualification for the Ironman World Championships. Professional athletes qualify for the championship through a point ranking system, where points are earned based on their final placement in Ironman and Ironman 70.3 events. The top 50 male and top 35 female professionals in points qualify for the championship. Amateur athletes qualify for the championship by receiving slots allocated to each age group's top finishers in a qualifying event. The Ironman qualifying events include:

Europe
 Ironman Austria in Klagenfurt, Austria
 Ironman Barcelona in Calella, Spain
 Ironman Copenhagen in Copenhagen, Denmark
 Ironman Emilia-Romagna in Cervia, Italy
 Ironman France in Nice, France
 Ironman Gdynia in Gdynia, Poland
 Ironman European Championship in Frankfurt am Main, Germany.
 Ironman Hamburg in Hamburg, Germany
 Ironman Haugesund in Haugesund, Norway
 Ironman Lanzarote in Puerto del Carmen, the Canary Islands, Spain
 Ironman Sweden in Kalmar, Sweden
 Ironman Switzerland, in Thun, Switzerland
 Ironman Tallinn in Tallinn, Estonia
 Ironman UK in Bolton, United Kingdom
 Ironman Vichy in Vichy, France
 Ironman Vitoria-Gasteiz Vitoria-Gasteiz, Spain
 Ironman Wales in Tenby, Wales
 Ironman Ireland, in Youghal, Ireland

North America
 Ironman Alaska in Juneau, Alaska
 Ironman Arizona in Tempe, Arizona
 Ironman Boulder in Boulder, Colorado
 Ironman Canada in Penticton, Canada
 Ironman Chattanooga in Chattanooga, Tennessee
 Ironman Cozumel in Cozumel, Mexico
 Ironman Florida in Panama City Beach, Florida (Haines City, Florida in 2018)
 Ironman Lake Placid in Lake Placid, New York
 Ironman Los Cabos in Los Cabos, Mexico
 Ironman Louisville in Louisville, Kentucky
 Ironman Maryland in Cambridge, Maryland
 Ironman Mont-Tremblant in Mont-Tremblant, Quebec, Canada
 Ironman North American Championship in The Woodlands, Texas
 Ironman Penticton in Penticton, BC, Canada
 Ironman St George in St George, Utah
 Ironman California in Sacramento, California
 Ironman Tulsa in Tulsa, Oklahoma
 Ironman Wisconsin in Madison, Wisconsin
 Ironman World Championship in Kona, Hawaii

South America
 Ironman Mar del Plata in Mar del Plata, Argentina
 Ironman South American Championship on Florianópolis, Brazil

Africa
 Ironman African Championship in Nelson Mandela Bay, South Africa
 Ironman African Championship in Taghit, Algeria

Asia
 Ironman Gurye in Gurye, South Korea
 Ironman Taiwan in Penghu, Taiwan
 Ironman Malaysia in Langkawi, Malaysia
 Ironman Philippines in Zambales, Philippines
 Ironman Kazakhstan in Nur-Sultan, Kazakhstan

Oceania
 Ironman Australia in Port Macquarie, New South Wales, Australia
 Ironman Asia-Pacific Championship in Cairns, Queensland, Australia
 Ironman Western Australia in Busselton, Australia
 Ironman New Zealand in Taupo, New Zealand

Specifications of the Ironman races

Notable Ironman triathletes

Men
 Mark Allen
 6-time winner of the Ironman Hawaii (joint men's record)
 5 consecutive victories in Hawaii (overall record)
 Jan Frodeno
 Current record holder for the fastest time for all iron-distance races (7:27:53 at Zwift Tri Battle Royale in 2021) (not a WTC event).
 Tim Don
 Official WTC-brand world record for fastest Ironman in Brazil 2017 with a time of 7:40:23
 Dave Scott
 6-time winner of the Ironman World Championship (joint men's record)
Scott Tinley, two-time winner, three-time Ironman World Series Champion and most top ten finishes.
 Luc Van Lierde
 First European male winner of Ironman Hawaii
 Holder of all-time record until 2011 (7:50:27 in 1996 Ironman Europe)
 Set the Hawaii course record (8:04:08) in 1996, which held until 2011

Women 
 Natascha Badmann
 First European female winner of Ironman World Championship
 6-time winner of the Ironman World Championships
 Mirinda Carfrae
 Three-time winner of the Ironman World Championship (2010, 2013, 2014)
 Reached the podium in 6 of 7 attempts at Ironman Hawaii (silver: 2009, 2011,2016; bronze: 2012; DNF: 2015, 2016)
 Women's record-holder for the overall Kona course (8:52:14, set in 2013) and the run course (2:50:38 in 2013)

 Paula Newby-Fraser
 8-time winner of Ironman Hawaii (overall record)
 4 consecutive victories in Hawaii
 24 Ironman victories overall (overall record)
 Nicknamed "The Queen of Kona"
 Daniela Ryf
 Winner of the 2015, 2016, 2017 and 2018 Ironman World Championship
 Eighth woman to earn more than one Kona title
 Set a course record of 8:26:18 (2018)
 Fastest female Ironman distance triathlon bike time: 4:26:07 (Kona, 2018)
 Official WTC-brand Ironman world record holder: 8:26:18 (Hawaii, 2018)
 Chrissie Wellington
 Winner of the Ironman Hawaii World Championship at her first attempt, less than a year after turning professional
 3-time successive and 4-time overall female winner of Ironman Hawaii (2007, 2008, 2009 and 2011)
 Former female Hawaii course record holder: 8:54:02 (2009)
 Current female record holder for the fastest time for all Ironman distance races (8:18:13 at Challenge Roth in 2011)
 Holds the two fastest-ever women's times over the Ironman distance triathlon: 8:18:13 (Roth, 2011), 8:19:13 (Roth, 2010).
 Fastest female Ironman distance triathlon marathon run time: 2:44:35 (Roth, 2011)
 Greatest number of sub-9 hour times (nine, five more than Paula Newby-Fraser's previous record)
 Undefeated over the Ironman distance triathlon
 First winner of the Ironman World Championship from the United Kingdom

Ironman world records
The designation of "world record" is unofficial due to lack of course certification as well as World Triathlon Corporation not maintaining official world record status.

Ironman 70.3

In 2005, WTC instituted the Ironman 70.3 race series. This shorter course, also known as a Half Ironman, consists of a  swim,  bike ride, and  run.  As with the Ironman series, it consists of a number of qualifying races at various locations worldwide ending in a world championship race with athletes drawn largely from top finishers in the qualifying events.

For amateur athletes, some 70.3 events acted as qualifiers for the full Ironman World Championships in Hawaii. However, the 2015 qualifying year marked a large de-emphasis on using certain Ironman 70.3 series races as a path for amateur athletes to qualify for the Ironman World Championships. The change was made to accommodate for the increased number of qualifying slots created from the full Ironman events which had been recently added.

For professional triathletes, up to three 70.3 events can be used to accumulate points to be put towards their championship qualifying point rankings.

Ownership and trademark

Advance Publications, the parent company that owns WTC and subsequently the Ironman brand, pays royalties to Marvel Entertainment for use of the Ironman brand. As part of the licensing agreement both Marvel and the former owner Wanda agreed to not use the "Iron Man" and "Ironman" trademarks in ways that would suggest an association with the other or cause brand confusion. World Triathlon Corporation CEO Andrew Messick has stated that the agreement has been in place for decades and the royalties paid are "not material to the business." Iron Man first appeared in 1963, whereas the first Ironman triathlon was raced in 1978.

The Ironman Triathlon logo is a trademark of the World Triathlon Corporation. The WTC has also registered the trademarks for "Ironman," "Ironman Triathlon," "M-Dot," and "70.3." WTC has licensed the Ironman name for use, such as in the line of Timex Ironman wristwatches.

See also
Ultra-triathlon
XTERRA Triathlon

Notes

References

External links
 Ironman.com
 World Triathlon Corporation
 k226.com - Directory of all other non-WTC 'Iron-distance' races

 
Sports competitions in Hawaii
Recurring sporting events established in 1978
1978 establishments in Hawaii